Club de Fútbol Lorca Deportiva was a Spanish football club based in Lorca, in the Region of Murcia. Founded in 1969 and dissolved in 1994 due to serious economic debts, it held home games at Estadio Municipal de San San José, with an 8,000-seat capacity.

CF Lorca played in Segunda División in 1984–85, finishing 20th and last in its only season in the category.

Following the side's disappearance another club was founded in the city, Lorca Club de Fútbol, through a merger between UD Lorca and Lorca Promesas. It also folded, in 2002.

Season to season

1 season in Segunda División
6 seasons in Segunda División B
8 seasons in Tercera División

Defunct football clubs in the Region of Murcia
 
Association football clubs established in 1969
Association football clubs disestablished in 1994
1969 establishments in Spain
1994 disestablishments in Spain
Lorca, Spain